Graffignano is a  (municipality) in the Province of Viterbo in the Italian region of Latium, located about  northwest of Rome and about  northeast of Viterbo.

Graffignano borders the following municipalities: Alviano, Attigliano, Bomarzo, Civitella d'Agliano, Lugnano in Teverina, Viterbo.
 
Sights include the Baglioni Castle (13th century), church of San Martino Vescovo.

References

Cities and towns in Lazio